Bryidae is an important subclass of Bryopsida. It is common throughout the whole world.  Members have a double peristome with alternating tooth segments.

Classification
The classification of the Bryidae.

Superorder: Bryanae
Bartramiales
Bryales
Hedwigiales
Orthotrichales
Rhizogoniales
Splachnales
Superorder: Hypnanae
Hypnodendrales
Ptychomniales
Hookeriales
Hypnales

References

Plant subclasses
Bryopsida